Pyae Phyo Aung (born 8 July 1991) is a footballer from Burma, and a Goalkeeper for the Myanmar national football team.

He currently plays for Southern Myanmar in Myanmar National League.

References

1991 births
Living people
Burmese footballers
Myanmar international footballers
Association football goalkeepers
Southern Myanmar F.C. players